The Gibralter Fire (also called the Gibralter Ridge Fire) was a wildfire in Kootenai National Forest, seven miles east of Eureka, Montana in the United States. The fire threatened numerous private property and structures, as well as recreational and historical sites in the forest.

Events

August
The Gibralter Fire was started by lightning and was first reported on August 7, 2017 at 9:06 PM in the Kootenai National Forest, seven miles east of Eureka. Burning in steep, inaccessible terrain and fueled by grass and understory timber, the Gibralter Fire caused immediate evacuations of residents in four areas of the forest and closed over 20 forest service roads east and north of U.S. Route 93 and numerous other areas of the forest, including Grave Creek Camp Ground, Bunchgrass Camp Ground, Clarence Creek Guard Station, Birch Creek Recreation Area, Big and Little Therriault Camp Ground, Horse Camp, Stahl Peak Lookout, Mount Wam Lookout and Wolverine Cabin. Temporary re-entry was allowed for residents over the course of the week. Red flag warning were declared on August 12. Evacuation orders were lifted on August 14, however evacuation warnings and specific closures remained in place. Progress was made on firebreaks, with 15 miles of breaks being built along Foothills and Grave Creek Roads. A helicopter helped with fire control and mop up continued.

On August 24, the fire made a "major run" according to the U.S. Forest Service, heading north and east by strong winds. It grew 1,500 acres towards Mount Scotty, marking  in total land burned. To combat the fire's growth, crews implemented group and individual tree torching and cleaned up brush to improve fuel breaks. Helicopters continued to drop water to stop spot fires and water pumps were installed to protect historic bridges in the area. The number of personnel fighting the fire was cut back, due to resources, to 87 on August 27.

September
Rain helped moderate fire activity and mop up continued. The fire was slowed by helicopter water drops and Wam Lookout was wrapped for fire protection and additional fire protections being implemented for private homes along Grave Creek. By September 12, the fire remained burning in Williams Creek and had moved over Locke Mountain and into Flathead National Forest. The next day, crews wrapped Ninko cabin to provide structure protection. Containment was successful in part to cooler temperatures and soaking rains.

Rehabilitation proceeded after containment. Crews felled fire-damaged trees along roads and the fire perimeter. They repaired and rebuilt 34 miles of roads. All trailheads impacted by the fire remain closed due to falling trees and debris.

See also
Caribou Fire
Weasel Fire

References

External links
 

2017 Montana wildfires
Kootenai National Forest